Howard Nicholas Bender (born September 25, 1951) is an American comic book artist best known for his work for DC Comics and Archie Comics.

Biography
Howard Bender was born in Cleveland, Ohio and grew up in the Highland Park neighborhood of Pittsburgh. He attended the Art Students League and was a co-founder of the Pittsburgh Comics Club in 1972. After working in the production department at Marvel Comics as a letterer and artist (1974–1980), he held a similar role at DC Comics (1981–1985). His Marvel work included adding tones to the black-and-white artwork in Marvel UK's Star Wars Weekly series. At DC Comics, Bender drew one-page introduction features in various mystery titles such as Ghosts, Secrets of Haunted House, The Unexpected, and Weird War Tales. He was the artist on the "Dial H for Hero" backup stories published in The New Adventures of Superboy and drew several Superman stories in Action Comics. His work on a Wildfire story in Legion of Super-Heroes vol. 2 #283 (Jan. 1982) was praised by fellow artist Keith Giffen. Bender drew Ghostbusters for First Comics and has worked on various series for Archie Comics. He and writer Craig Boldman created Mr. Fixitt in 1989. Bender collaborated with Jack C. Harris on a Sherlock Holmes comic strip in the 1990s. In addition to comic books, Bender also works as a caricature artist.

Bibliography
AC Comics
 Femforce #7 (1987)

Apple Press
 Blood of Dracula #9 (1989) 
 Mr. Fixitt #1–2 (1989–1990)

Archie Comics
 
 Archie & Friends Double Digest Magazine #12, 30, 33 (2012–2014)
 Archie 1000 Page Comics Jamboree #1 (2013)
 Archie Comics Digest #109, 232, 248, 263 (1991–2015)
 Archie's Funhouse Double Digest #15, 21 (2015–2016)
 Archie's Pals 'n' Gals #212 (1990)
 Archie's Pals 'n' Gals Double Digest Magazine #113, 130 (2007–2009)
 Archie's R/C Racers #2, 4–5 (1989–1990)
 Betty and Veronica Comics Digest Magazine #72 (1995)
 Betty and Veronica Double Digest Magazine #227 (2014)
 Everything's Archie #152 (1990)
 Jughead and Archie Double Digest #6, 12, 15 (2014–2015)
 Jughead with Archie Digest #111 (1992)
 Jughead's Double Digest #54 (1998)
 Life with Archie #284 (1991)
 Mighty Mutanimals #9 (1993)
 World of Archie Double Digest #15, 20, 40–41, 56 (2012–2016)

Comicfix
 The Charlton Arrow #2 (2014)

DC Comics
 
 Action Comics #557–558, 563–564, 566, 568–570, 572–575 (1984–1986)
 Adventure Comics #490 ("Dial H for Hero"); #497–499, 501–503 (one page each) (1982–1983)
 All-Star Squadron #43 (one page) (1985)
 America vs. the Justice Society #3–4 (1985)
 Ghosts #100–110, 112 (1981–1982)
 House of Mystery #289 (one page) (1981)
 Legion of Super-Heroes vol. 2 #283, 291, 295, 300 (1982–1983)
 The New Adventures of Superboy #29–49 ("Dial H for Hero" backup stories) (1982–1984)
 The Saga of the Swamp Thing #5 (Phantom Stranger backup story) (1982) 
 Secrets of Haunted House #35–36, 39–46 (1981–1982)
 The Unexpected #210–218 (1981–1982)
 Weird War Tales #99, 101 (1981)
 Who's Who in the Legion of Super-Heroes #5–6 (1988)
 Who's Who: The Definitive Directory of the DC Universe #2, 5–7, 11–13, 17, 19–20 (1985–1986)
 Young All-Stars #7 (1987)

First Comics
 Ghostbusters #1–3 (1987)
 Grimjack #25 (1986)

Hamilton Comics
 Dread of Night #1 (1991)
 Maggots #2 (1992)

Heroic Publishing
 Mr. Fixitt vol. 2 #1 (1993)

Marvel Comics
 
 Crazy Magazine #69 (1980)
 Kid Colt, Outlaw #219 (one page) (1977) 
 Micronauts: The New Voyages #17, 19 (1986)
 Peter Porker, the Spectacular Spider-Ham #10 (1986)
 Kickers, Inc. #4 (1987)
 Official Handbook of the Marvel Universe Deluxe Edition #7 (1986)
 Savage Sword of Conan #101 (one page) (1984)
 SilverHawks #6 (1988) 
 What The--?! #23 (1992)

Now Comics
 Slimer #8 (1989)

Triad Publications
 The Honeymooners #12 (1989)

References

External links
 
 Howard Bender at Mike's Amazing World of Comics
 Howard Bender at the Unofficial Handbook of Marvel Comics Creators

1951 births
20th-century American artists
21st-century American artists
American caricaturists
American comics artists
American comic strip cartoonists
Artists from Cleveland
Artists from Pittsburgh
Art Students League of New York alumni
Comic book letterers
Comics inkers
DC Comics people
Living people
Marvel Comics people